José Antonio Mota Báez (born December 31, 1953 in San Cristóbal, Dominican Republic) is a former Major League Baseball player.

Professional career

Los Angeles Dodgers

Seattle Mariners
He was the favorite for the second basemen spot going into the  spring training.

In his debut on April 6,  against the California Angels, Báez delivered the first hit in Mariners history. He finished the '77 season batting .259 with 79 hits, one home run, 14 doubles and 17 RBIs in 91 games.

With the Mariners in  he hit .160 in 50 at bats.

St. Louis Cardinals
Báez was later traded to the St. Louis Cardinals for a player to be named later (eventually revealed to be Mike Potter). Báez spent the rest of the  season with the Triple-A Springfield Redbirds.

Personal life
He is the cousin of former Major League players Andy Mota, José Mota, and Manny Mota.

References

External links

1953 births
Albuquerque Dukes players
Bakersfield Dodgers players
Daytona Beach Dodgers players
Dominican Republic expatriate baseball players in the United States
Living people
Major League Baseball players from the Dominican Republic
Major League Baseball second basemen
Ogden Dodgers players
People from San Cristóbal Province
Santo Domingo Azucareros players
Seattle Mariners players
Springfield Redbirds players
Waterbury Dodgers players